This article displays all lists related to Stargate.

List of Stargate media
List of Stargate audiobooks
List of Stargate comics
List of Stargate literature
Lists of Stargate episodes
List of Stargate SG-1 episodes 
List of Stargate Atlantis episodes
List of Stargate Infinity episodes
List of Stargate Universe episodes
Characters in Stargate
List of Stargate SG-1 characters
List of Stargate Atlantis characters
List of Stargate Infinity characters
List of Stargate Universe characters
Mythology of Stargate